The 1940–41 La Salle Explorers men's basketball team represented La Salle University during the 1940–41 NCAA men's basketball season. The head coach was Leonard Tanseer, coaching the explorers in his eighth season. The team finished with an overall record of 11–8.

Schedule

|-

References

La Salle Explorers men's basketball seasons
La Salle
La Salle
La Salle